The Suit of Wands is one of four suits in tarot, collectively known as the Minor Arcana. Like the other tarot suits, the suit of wands contains fourteen cards: ace (one), two through ten, page and knight (sometimes referred to as princess and prince), queen and king. Tarot cards are used throughout much of Europe to play Tarot card games, where Wands corresponds to the suit of Batons. In English-speaking countries, where the games are largely unknown, Tarot cards came to be utilized primarily for divinatory purposes.

Divinatory and occult meanings
In Aleister Crowley's 1944 The Book of Thoth, the suit of wands is associated with the action of the Will and the element of fire. The meaning of the suit as a whole focuses on ideas or readings associated with primal energy, spirituality, inspiration, determination, strength, intuition, creativity, ambition, expansion, and original thought.

Generally the suit is interpreted by modern English-language astrology practitioners as relating to work and accomplishments, or even anything broadly related to fruitfulness. Reaping the benefits of hard work is a fundamental aspect of such interpretations of the suit.

Similar themes include new beginnings, final endings, and creative destruction (such as the way controlled usage of fire can be used to clear land  in preparation for new crops, or planting).  This metaphorical relationship between the suit and fire is often explored by tarot practitioners who are also basing interpretations on astrology.

The cards of this suit also evoke the wide-eyed optimism of youth and the basic driving force of life.

The meanings of the Wands Tarot cards deal with the spiritual level of consciousness and mirror what is important to you at the core of your being. They address what makes you tick – your personality, ego, enthusiasm, self-concept, and personal energy, both internal and external.

The negative aspects of the Suit of Wands include illusion, egotistical behaviour, impulsiveness, a lack of direction or purpose, or a perception of meaninglessness.

Wands cards often represent the astrological signs of Fire: Leo, Sagittarius and Aries. A wands court card often relates to a person with a Leo, Sagittarius or Aries star sign. Generally, Wands people are energetic, charismatic, warm and spiritual.

Card images in the Rider–Waite tarot deck

See also 
 Batons - suit of Latin (Italian/Spanish) playing cards

References

Wands